Peter Weir (born 1944) is an Australian film director.

Peter Weir may also refer to:

 Peter Weir, Baron Weir of Ballyholme (born 1968), Northern Irish politician
 Peter Weir (footballer) (born 1958), Scottish footballer
 Peter Ingram Weir (1864–1943), Scottish artist